Aral is a village in Kara-Daryya rural community, in the western part of the Suzak District, Jalal-Abad Region, Kyrgyzstan. Its population was 6,574 in 2021.

Population

References
 

Populated places in Jalal-Abad Region